The 1995 NCAA Women's Golf Championships were contested at the 14th annual NCAA-sanctioned golf tournament to determine the individual and team national champions of women's collegiate golf in the United States.

This was the final year that the NCAA would hold just one annual women's golf championship for all programs across Division I, Division II, and Division III.

The tournament was held at the Country Club of Landfall in Wilmington, North Carolina.

Two-time defending champions Arizona State again won the team championship, the Sun Devils' fourth.

Kristel Mourgue d’Algue, from Arizona State, won the individual title.

Individual results

Individual champion
 Kristel Mourgue d’Algue, Arizona State (283, −5)

Team leaderboard

 DC = Defending champion
 Debut appearance

References

NCAA Women's Golf Championship
Golf in North Carolina
NCAA Women's Golf Championship
NCAA Women's Golf Championship
NCAA Women's Golf Championship